Sosnová is a municipality and village in Česká Lípa District in the Liberec Region of the Czech Republic. It has about 700 inhabitants.

Sport
Sosnová is the site of the Autodrom Sosnová, an auto racing track.

References

External links

Villages in Česká Lípa District